The 2019 Kentucky Secretary of State election was held on November 5, 2019, to elect the secretary of state of Kentucky. Primary elections were held on May 21, 2019. Incumbent Democratic secretary Alison Lundergan Grimes was ineligible to run for a third term due to term limits, creating the first open election for secretary of state since 2003.

Republican nominee Michael Adams narrowly defeated Democratic nominee Heather French Henry. This was the only statewide race in Kentucky in 2019 besides the gubernatorial election in which the Democratic nominee came close to winning. It was also the only non-gubernatorial statewide election in Kentucky, Louisiana, or Mississippi where the Democrat achieved more than 45% of the vote in 2019.

Democratic primary

Candidates 
Jason Belcher, U.S. Air Force veteran and writer
Jason Griffith, teacher and businessman
Heather French Henry, former Kentucky Commissioner of Veterans Affairs and former Miss America
Geoff Sebesta, comic book artist

Results

Republican primary

Candidates 
Michael Adams, general counsel for the Republican Governors Association and former aide to U.S. senator Mitch McConnell
Andrew English, former general counsel for the Kentucky Justice and Public Safety Cabinet and U.S. Navy veteran
Stephen Knipper, cyber security expert, former Erlanger city councilor and nominee for Secretary of State in 2015
Carl Nett, former counterintelligence officer

Polling

Results

General election

Polling

Results

Notes

References 

Secretary of State
Kentucky
Kentucky Secretary of State elections